Elisa Desco (born 30 May 1982) is an Italian female sky runner and mountain runner, world champion at the 2014 Skyrunning World Championships held in Chamonix,  and European champion at the 2008 European Mountain Running Championships held in Zell am Harmersbach.

Biography
She was also world champion at individual senior level she won 7 medals (1 gold individual and 6 with the national team) at the 2008 World Mountain Running Championships but was disqualified for doping.

She is engaged to the Italian mountain running champion Marco De Gasperi and they live in Bormio with their two daughters named Lidia (2011) and Cecilia (2017).

Achievements

Team results
World Mountain Running Championships
 2005, 2013, 2014 (3)

National titles
Italian Mountain Running Championships
Mountain running: 2008, 2013, 2015, 2018, 2019 (5)
Italian Long Distance Mountain Running Championships
Long distance mountain running: 2013, 2014 (2)

References

External links
 
 
 Elisa Desco at FIDAL 
 

1982 births
Living people
Italian female mountain runners
Italian sky runners
Doping cases in athletics
Skyrunning World Championships winners